Tournay is a commune in the Hautes-Pyrénées department, southwestern France. Tournay station has rail connections to Toulouse, Tarbes and Pau.

Geography

Climate

Tournay has a oceanic climate (Köppen climate classification Cfb).

See also
Communes of the Hautes-Pyrénées department

References

Communes of Hautes-Pyrénées